Elizabeth Anne Greene (born May 1, 2003) is an American actress known for her title role as Dawn Harper in the Nickelodeon sitcom Nicky, Ricky, Dicky & Dawn from 2014 to 2018. She has been starring as Sophie Dixon in the ABC family drama A Million Little Things since 2018.

Life and career
Elizabeth Anne Greene was born on May 1, 2003 in Dallas, Texas. She made her television debut in the Nickelodeon sitcom Nicky, Ricky, Dicky & Dawn in the title role of Dawn Harper, the only girl of quadruplets. The show ran from September 13, 2014 to August 4, 2018. In 2018, she was cast as Sophie Dixon in the ABC drama A Million Little Things.

Filmography

Awards and nominations

References

External links
 
 
 

2003 births
Actresses from Dallas
American child actresses
American television actresses
Living people
21st-century American actresses